The Maursund Tunnel is an undersea tunnel in Troms og Finnmark county, Norway. The tunnel goes under the Maursundet strait connecting the mainland part of Nordreisa Municipality with the island of Kågen in Skjervøy Municipality. The tunnel, which was opened in 1991, and the nearby Skattørsundet Bridge connect the large village of Skjervøy to the mainland.

References

Skjervøy
Nordreisa
Road tunnels in Troms og Finnmark
Roads within the Arctic Circle